The Louisiana Tech Bulldogs basketball program, nicknamed the Dunkin' Dogs, represents intercollegiate men's basketball at Louisiana Tech University. The program competes in Conference USA in Division I of the National Collegiate Athletic Association (NCAA) and plays home games at the Thomas Assembly Center in Ruston, Louisiana. Talvin Hester is in his first season as the Bulldogs' head coach.

History

Conference affiliations
1925–1939: Southern Intercollegiate Athletic Association
1939–1948: Louisiana Intercollegiate Conference
1948–1971: Gulf States Conference
1971–1987: Southland Conference
1987–1991: American South Conference
1991–2001: Sun Belt Conference
2001–2013: Western Athletic Conference
2013–present: Conference USA

Championships

Conference regular season championships

Conference tournament championships

Postseason

NCAA Division I Tournament results
The Bulldogs have appeared in the NCAA Division I tournament five times. Their combined record is 4–5.

NCAA Division II Tournament results
The Bulldogs have appeared in the NCAA Division II tournament two times. Their combined record is 2–2.

NIT results
Louisiana Tech has appeared in ten National Invitation Tournaments. Their combined record is 15–10.

Vegas 16 results
The Bulldogs have appeared in one Vegas 16. Their record is 0–1.

CIT results
Louisiana Tech has appeared in one CollegeInsider.com Tournament. Their combined record is 1–1.

NAIA tournament results
The Bulldogs have appeared in the NAIA tournament four times. Their combined record is 1–4.

Home venues

Memorial Gymnasium (1952–1982)

In 1952, Memorial Gymnasium was constructed on the Louisiana Tech University campus in Ruston to serve as the home of the Louisiana Tech Bulldogs basketball team. Today Memorial Gym serves as a practice facility for the basketball team.

Thomas Assembly Center (1982–present)

The Thomas Assembly Center is an 8,000-seat multi-purpose arena in Ruston, Louisiana. The arena, named for its benefactor and businessman Samuel M. Thomas, is home to the Division I NCAA Louisiana Tech University Bulldogs men's basketball team.

Traditions

Dunkin' Dogs
The Dunkin' Dogs nickname emerged during the 1982–83 season led by Karl Malone and Willie Simmons making highlight reel dunks. The tradition has continued through time as the current Dunkin' Dogs led by Raheem Appleby, Michale Kyser, and Alex Hamilton have made several dunks featured nationally on ESPN's SportsCenter Top Plays and Fox Sports Live's The 1.

Hoop Troop

Hoop Troop is the official basketball pep band at Louisiana Tech University. The Hoop Troop performs at most men's basketball home games and travels to select road basketball games. The band also usually travels to all post-season games played by the Bulldogs, and is known nationally as one of the best basketball bands in college basketball.  In the 2005 post-season, the Hoop Troop was featured in a Sports Illustrated's College Edition article, "65 Things We Want to See During March Madness" in which states, "30) The Louisiana Tech pep band, a.k.a. the Hoop Troop, the funniest band in the land." The Hoop Troop was the only basketball band to be listed.

Players

Basketball Hall of Fame
Leon Barmore, 2003
Karl Malone, 2010

Retired numbers

All-Americans
Jackie Moreland – 1958, 1959, 1960
Ray Germany – 1959, 1960
Mike Green – 1971, 1972, 1973
Mike McConathy – 1976
Karl Malone – 1983, 1984, 1985
Randy White – 1989

Conference Player of the Year
Jackie Moreland – 1960
Mike Green – 1973
Mike McConathy – 1976
Karl Malone – 1983
Randy White – 1988, 1989
Ron Ellis – 1992
Gerrod Henderson – 2000
Speedy Smith – 2015
Alex Hamilton – 2016

Conference Freshman of the Year
Antonio Meeking - 2000 (Sun Belt)
Paul Millsap - 2004 (WAC)
Raheem Appleby - 2012 (WAC)
DaQuan Bracey - 2017 (C-USA)
Kenneth Lofton, Jr. - 2021 (C-USA)

Leading scorers

NBA draftees

The Bulldogs have had 14 players selected in the NBA draft, including 4 first round picks. Twice the Bulldogs have had multiple players taken in the same draft year (1985 and 1992).

Other Bulldogs in the NBA
Erik McCree - Utah Jazz
Kenneth Lofton Jr. – Memphis Grizzlies

Other Bulldogs overseas
Kyle Gibson (born 1987) - Hapoel Galil Elyon of the Israeli Basketball Premier League
Alex Hamilton (born 1993) - Hapoel Eilat in the Israeli Basketball Premier League

Coaches

Head coaches

Bulldogs in coaching
Kyle Keller – Stephen F. Austin

See also
Louisiana Tech Lady Techsters basketball
List of NCAA Division I men's basketball programs

References

External links